Pasiones (Passions) is the 14th album and 13th studio album by Puerto Rican singer Ednita Nazario. It was released on July 26, 1994. Two songs from the album, "Quiero Que Me Hagas el Amor" and "Gata Sin Luna", became a number one hit on the Billboard Latin Pop Airplay chart.

Track listing
 "Gata Sin Luna" - 4:27 (Luis Ángel Márquez)
 "Dime Tú" - 4:09 (Sharon Riley, Jonathan Dwayne)
 "Un Beso" - 4:05 (Jonathan Dwayne)
 "Como Antes" - 4:15 (Luis Ángel Márquez)
 "Te Sigo Esperando" - 4:12 (Marco Flores)
 "Contra El Pasado" - 3:49 (K. C. Porter, Jonathan Dwayne)
 "Quiero Que Me Hagas El Amor" - 4:26 (Luis Ángel Márquez)
 "No Voy A Llorar" - 3:35 (Ednita Nazario)
 "Evolución" - 3:44 (K. C. Porter, Jonathan Dwayne)
 "Entre La Puerta Y El Reloj" - 4:34 (Marco Flores)
 "No Puedo Olvidarte" - 4:32 (Jonathan Dwayne)

Singles
 Quiero Que Me Hagas El Amor
 Te Sigo Esperando
 Como Antes
 Dime Tú
 Gata Sin Luna
 No Puedo Olvidarte

Personnel
 Produced by Ednita Nazario and K. C. Porter

Charts

References

Ednita Nazario albums
1994 albums